Peter Colin Hodgson (born 13 June 1950) is a former New Zealand politician of the Labour Party and Member of Parliament for Dunedin North from 1990 to 2011.

Early life
Hodgson was born in Whangarei, and received a Bachelor's degree in veterinary science from Massey University. He has worked as a veterinarian, a high school teacher, and a fruit and vegetable retailer.

Member of Parliament

Hodgson joined the Labour Party in 1976, and shortly afterwards became the manager for Stan Rodger's successful campaign in the Dunedin North seat. After holding a number of other Labour Party roles, including that of marginal seats organiser, he was himself nominated to replace Rodger in the 1990 election. He was successful, and became the MP for Dunedin North.

In November 1990 he was appointed as Labour's spokesperson for Science & Technology and Planning by Labour leader Mike Moore.

When the Labour Party formed a government after the 1999 election, Hodgson was appointed to Cabinet. During Labour's nine years in power, Hodgson's portfolios included Economic Development; Tertiary Education; Research, Science and Technology; Health; Transport; Commerce; Land Information; Statistics; Energy (1999–2004); and Fisheries and Forestry. He was also Associate Minister of Health; Industry and Regional Development; and Foreign Affairs.

In 2001, during the filming of The Lord of the Rings movie trilogy in New Zealand, Hodgson was given the title Minister of the Rings, responsible for investigating methods of capitalising on the boom in tourism to New Zealand that followed the release of the films.

In May 2007, Hodgson briefed the Welsh Labour Party's executive on the practicalities of co-operation between Welsh parties outside a formal coalition, after the 2007 Welsh Assembly elections led to a Labour minority government looking likely.

Labour was defeated in the 2008 general election. Hodgson retained his seat with a majority of 7,155.

In opposition, Hodgson was Labour's "chief dirt-digger and mudslinger". The scandals he exposed caused two government ministers to resign.

Hodgson retired from politics at the end of the 49th Parliament in 2011, after 21 years as the MP for Dunedin North. He was succeeded by Labour's David Clark.

Life after Parliament
In 2013, Hodgson was appointed a member of the Representation Commission to determine New Zealand electoral boundaries.

References

External links
 
 Pete Hodgson at the New Zealand Parliament website

|-

|-

|-

1950 births
Members of the Cabinet of New Zealand
New Zealand Labour Party MPs
People from Whangārei
New Zealand veterinarians
Massey University alumni
New Zealand MPs for Dunedin electorates
Living people
Members of the New Zealand House of Representatives
21st-century New Zealand politicians